KOAS (105.7 FM, Jammin' 105.7) is a radio station broadcasting an urban adult contemporary format. Licensed to Dolan Springs, Arizona, United States, the station serves the Laughlin/Las Vegas/Dolan Springs area.  The station is currently owned by Beasley Broadcast Group, Inc. through licensee Beasley Media Group, LLC.  The station's studios are located in the unincorporated Clark County area of Spring Valley, while its transmitter is in Dolan Springs.

Translators
KOAS operates an FM booster transmitter on 105.7 MHz in Henderson, Nevada. The booster, known as KOAS-FM1, transmits with 2,500 watts of ERP. It provides the Las Vegas area with a stronger signal than the main transmitter located in Dolan Springs.
K288FS, a translator of KOAS, serves nearby Pahrump, Nevada with a two hundred fifty-watt signal on 105.5 MHz. K288FS is currently silent and has never been on the air.

History
The station was assigned the call sign KCRR on August 1, 1984.  On November 20, 1987, the station changed its call sign to KFLG. On December 12, 2000, the station became KBYE.

Smooth jazz (2001-2009) 
On August 8, 2001, KBYE flipped to smooth jazz as "The Oasis", with the station changing call letters to the current KOAS on the 14th.

Rhythmic adult contemporary (2009-2013) 
On December 26, 2009, after airing Christmas music for a month, KOAS dropped Smooth Jazz for Rhythmic AC, giving the market two stations in the format, the other being KPLV (which would shift to top 40 roughly four months later).

Rhythmic oldies (2013-2019) 
On April 1, 2013, KOAS shifted their format to rhythmic oldies. In November 2013, the long time "Oasis" moniker (from the previous smooth jazz format) was dropped in favor of "Old School 105.7".

Urban adult contemporary (2019-present) 
On June 17, 2019, at Midnight, KOAS flipped to urban adult contemporary as Jammin 105.7.

Gallery

References

External links

105.7koas

OAS
Radio stations established in 1984
OAS
Urban adult contemporary radio stations in the United States